The Junior women's race at the 2002 IAAF World Cross Country Championships was held at the Leopardstown Racecourse near Dublin, Ireland, on March 23, 2002.  Reports onf the event were given in The New York Times, in the Herald, and for the IAAF.

Complete results for individuals,  for teams, medallists, and the results of British athletes who took part were published.

Race results

Junior women's race (5.962 km)

Individual

Teams

Note: Athletes in parentheses did not score for the team result (n/s: nonscorer)

Participation
According to an unofficial count, 110 athletes from 31 countries participated in the Junior women's race.  This is in agreement with the official numbers as published.

 (6)
 (4)
 (2)
 (5)
 (5)
 (1)
 (2)
 (4)
 (6)
 (5)
 (1)
 (6)
 (5)
 (5)
 (6)
 (1)
 (2)
 (1)
 (1)
 (1)
 (5)
 (5)
 (6)
 (2)
 (1)
 (4)
 (6)
 (6)
 (4)
 (1)
 (1)

See also
 2002 IAAF World Cross Country Championships – Senior men's race
 2002 IAAF World Cross Country Championships – Men's short race
 2002 IAAF World Cross Country Championships – Junior men's race
 2002 IAAF World Cross Country Championships – Senior women's race
 2002 IAAF World Cross Country Championships – Women's short race

References

Junior women's race at the World Athletics Cross Country Championships
IAAF World Cross Country Championships
Ath
2002 in women's athletics
2002 in youth sport